Penn State Graduate School is the university organization in charge of the admission, matriculation and graduation of all graduate students (with the exception of professional students in the College of Medicine and The Dickinson School of Law). In addition to its administrative functions, the Graduate School serves as a main unit that promotes and provides professional development for students to supplement the efforts of graduate programs and colleges.  The Graduate School is also in charge of reviewing the quality of graduate degree programs and helping with university-wide strategic planning for graduate education efforts and initiatives.

History   

Seed of graduate education at Penn State was planted by Evan Pugh, the first university president. Immediately upon his arrival at Penn State in 1859, Pugh established a research laboratory. Having completed his chemistry doctorate in Germany, at the University of Göttingen, he was heavily influenced by the German academic model and was constantly engaged in scientific experimentation, investigation and publication.
As a consequence, first graduate students to earn degrees from Penn State did so under Pugh's guidance in 1863: Alfred Smith (later a professor of chemistry at Penn State) and Augustus King (the son of the president of Columbia University) were awarded the Master of Scientific Agriculture degree.  Between 1863 and the establishment of the Graduate School in 1922, almost 900 graduate students engaged in academic study at Penn State. At this time, graduate study was modeled after Pugh's academic experience in Göttingen – it was an independent pursuit, shaped by the individual student's and advisor's interests. No formal graduate classes were offered until the establishment of college-wide standards in the 1890s. At this point, a thesis became a universal requirement for all advanced degrees.
In 1922, President John Thomas established the Graduate School under the direction of Dean Frank D. Kern. At that point, the Graduate School made available a small number of graduate teaching assistantships, each with an $800 per year stipend, as well as a fellowship sponsored by the Elliot Company, an electrical engineering firm in Pittsburgh. During the first eight years of the Graduate School's existence, graduate students earned 422 advanced degrees: 15 Ph.D.s, 147 M.A.s, 208 M.S.s, and 52 technical degrees.

Penn State's Graduate School today is one of the largest in the nation with more than 10,000 graduate students enrolled throughout the Penn State system. It has awarded 113,444 graduate degrees to date.  It caters to increasingly diverse graduate student body at Penn State - international enrollment has increased to an all-time high with more than 2,200 students from China, India, Korea, Taiwan, Turkey, Japan, Canada, Thailand, the United Kingdom, Germany and a host of other countries.

Leadership 

Henry C. "Hank" Foley  (Professor of Information Sciences and Technology, Ph.D in Physical Chemistry, Penn State) is the university's vice president for research and dean of the Graduate School. In his current role, Dr. Foley is responsible for overseeing a research enterprise with over $765 million in expenditures and over 10,000 graduate students in more than 150 graduate degree programs, including 121 doctorate, 110 academic master's and 73 professional master's degree programs.

Regina Vasilatos-Younken, (Professor of Endocrine Physiology and Nutrition, Ph.D. in animal nutrition, Penn State) is senior associate dean of The Graduate School. Dr. Vasilatos-Younken is responsible for operations and planning at the Graduate School.

Suzanne C. Adair, (Ph.D. in Educational Theory and Policy, Penn State) is assistant dean of the Graduate School. Dr. Adair is in charge of the Office of Graduate Educational Equity Programs and management of graduate student concerns and all programming directly related to graduate students, including enrichment and professional development activities. In addition, Dr. Adair also manages the Office of Postdoctoral Affairs.

References

External links 
 
 The Pennsylvania State University

Pennsylvania State University
Commonwealth System of Higher Education
Educational institutions established in 1855
Universities and colleges in Centre County, Pennsylvania
1855 establishments in Pennsylvania